This list of motor vehicle awards is an index to articles that describe notable awards given to motor vehicles. The list is broken into "car of the year", other car awards, awards for commercial vehicles including trucks and trains, engines and people. The sub-lists are arranged by the country of the sponsoring organization, but typically awards are open to entries from around the world.

Car of the year

Other car awards

Commercial vehicles

Engines

People

See also

 Lists of awards
 List of design awards
 List of business and industry awards
 List of engineering awards

References

 
Motor vehicles